"Ladies Hit Squad" is a song performed by English rapper Skepta featuring vocals from D Double E and ASAP Nast. It was released as the third single from Skepta's fourth album Konnichiwa (2016) on 14 February 2016 through Boy Better Know. The song peaked at number 89 on the UK Singles Chart and number 28 on the UK R&B Singles Chart. The song shares its name with a UK garage crew consisting of Wiley, DJ Target and Maxwell D, which was active around the beginning of the 21st century.

Music video
A music video to accompany the release of "Ladies Hit Squad" was first released onto YouTube on 14 February 2016 at a total length of three minutes and fifty seconds.

Track listing

Chart performance

Release history

References

2016 songs
2016 singles
Skepta songs
Songs written by Skepta